Clatter for Control is Hangedup's third album, released in April 2005 by Constellation Records.  Its catalog number is CST034.

Harris Newman, who mastered the album, plays bass with the duo on track 8.

Track listing
"Klang Klang"
"Alarm"
"A Different Kind of Function"
"Kick-Back-Hub"
"Eksplozije"
"Go Let's Go"
"Derailleur"
"Fuck This Place"
"How We Keep Time"
"Junk the Clatter"

References

2005 albums
Hangedup albums
Constellation Records (Canada) albums